Johnson Arthur Sakaja  (born 2 February 1985) is a Kenyan politician serving as the governor of Nairobi City County since  25 August 2022. Previously, he served as the Senator of Nairobi from 2017 to 2022, and as a nominated Member of the National Assembly from 2013 to 2017. He was nominated to Parliament by The National Alliance (TNA) party which was part of the ruling Jubilee Coalition (now Jubilee Party). He was the National Chairman of The National Alliance (TNA) until 9 September 2016 when the party merged with 12 others to form the Jubilee Party.

Political life 
Sakaja was elected as the Chairman of the Student Organisation of Teams University (SOTU) while studying at the Teams University.

After the 2008 post-election crisis, he contributed to the formulation of the 2010 constitution where he made submissions on the definition of constituency boundaries. At the age of 26, Sakaja helped form The National Alliance (TNA) of which he became the chairman. This was the party that the former Kenyan president Uhuru Kenyatta rode to electoral victory in 2013.

As Senator for Nairobi, Sakaja participated in law making, allocation of national revenue and exercising oversight over national revenue allocated to the county government. He also served as the Chairperson of the Kenya Young Parliamentarians Association, a parliamentary caucus responsible for advocacy of youth empowering policies and legislation as well as mentorship of youth leaders. Sakaja co-authored a book in collaboration with the Kenyan Section of the International Commission of Jurists on Representation and Fiscal Decentralization. He served as the Chairperson of the Committee of Labour and Social Welfare, a standing Committee which deals with matters pertaining manpower and human resource planning, gender, cultural and social welfare, national heritage, betting, lotteries, sports, public entertainment, public amenities and recreation.

Parliament 
Sakaja was seconded by TNA to the National Assembly as one of its three nominated MPs. In the National Assembly, Sakaja was seconded by Jubilee Coalition to the House Business Committee, the Joint Committee on National Cohesion and Equal Opportunity and Departmental Committee on Finance, Planning and Trade. He is currently the Chairman of the Joint Committee on National Cohesion and Equal Opportunity. Sakaja is also the Chairman of Kenya Young Parliamentary Association which is a caucus made up of MPs who are below 35 years of age.

In his role at Parliament, Sakaja has sponsored bills which the president assented to:
 Public Procurement and Asset Disposal Act, 2015 –which essentially provides for "30% Procurement Reservation Criteria" for Youth, Women and Persons with disability.
 The National Youth Employment Authority Bill, which creates a The National Employment Authority that shall actively seek opportunities for all the jobseekers in its database both locally and internationally, and prepare them for those opportunities through capacity building programs.
 The Private Security Regulation Bill, which provides for a framework for cooperation between private security companies and the national security organs
 The Disaster Risk Management Bill, providing for a more effective organization of disaster risk management and mitigation, of preparedness for, response to and recovery from emergencies and disasters

Nairobi Senatorial race 2017 
In 2017 Sakaja stepped out of the Gubernatorial race and opted to go for the Senator seat.

2022 Nairobi gubernatorial race 
In November 2021, Sakaja declared his interest to vie for Nairobi City Governor's seat in the 2022 Nairobi gubernatorial election. He was subsequently cleared by the IEBC to run for the seat on June 7, 2022.
His clearance by IEBC has however remained a point of contention  since there is doubt about his academic qualifications. Mr Sakaja won the gubernatorial election with 699,392 votes, while his Jubilee Party opponent Polycarp Igathe got 573,516 votes.

Sakaja is deputized by James Njoroge Muchiri who had been serving as Absa Bank Kenya Ltd Chief Operating Officer. They were sworn into office on 25 August 2022 at Kenyatta International Convention Centre (KICC). In attendance was the President of Kenya William Ruto among other guests.

Awards 
African Achievers Award Change-maker of the Year 2016
Jacob Well Award 2016 (Men Impacting Differently)

Membership and association 
Chairman Kenya Young Parliamentarians Association
Chairman of the Committee on Labor and Social Welfare
Vice Chairman of the Committee on National Security, Defense and Foreign Relations
Patron of Kenya Professional Boxing Commission
Executive Member Kenya National Private Security Workers Union
Patron of AFC Leopards Football Club
Member of the Liaison Committee in the National Assembly

Controversies
Sakaja's political career has included several controversies and allegations of corruption. While he claimed to have graduated from the University of Nairobi with Bachelor of Science in Actuarial Science, UON in a letter confirmed he was yet to graduate. After this exposure from UON, he presented a Degree in Management from Teams University in Uganda. Further investigations suggested he did not even attend the said university in Uganda.  In December 2020, he was adversely mentioned in a Sh. 7.8 billion KEMSA Scandal. Documents tabled in parliament revealed that the lawmaker received kickbacks from Shop N Buy. A Kenyan official, Charles Juma, who acted as procurement director at KEMSA, alleged that Sakaja pressurized Kemsa CEO Jonah Manjari to award a commitment letter for Shop N Buy.

The High Court has dismissed a petition challenging the validity of Nairobi Senator Johnson Sakaja’s academic qualifications due to lack of evidence.

Misinformation on various social media 
During the 2022 Kenyan General Elections, several pieces of misinformation were propagated concerning Johnson Sakaja. For example, a screenshot of an Infotrak poll that showed Sakaja leading in the senatorial race was widely shared on social media. However, PesaCheck, a fact-checking organization, confirmed that the screenshot was fabricated and did not represent the actual results of the poll.

Another piece of misinformation that was spread about Sakaja concerned his academic credentials. A screenshot purportedly showing that the Independent Electoral and Boundaries Commission (IEBC) had written to Team University to verify Sakaja's academic credentials was shared on social media. However, PesaCheck confirmed that the screenshot was altered, and the IEBC had not written to Team University about Sakaja's academic qualifications. Misinformation was also spread through a doctored video claiming to show Deputy President William Ruto disowning Sakaja. PesaCheck confirmed that the video was altered and did not reflect the actual statements made by Ruto.

References

External links 
Official website
"DCI links Sakaja to global crime ring as ‘fake’ degree saga takes another twist"

The National Alliance politicians
University of Nairobi alumni
Members of the National Assembly (Kenya)
1985 births
Living people